Alan Scott Watson  (born 26 November 1950) is a professional magician living and performing in Auckland, New Zealand. He has been performing professionally for more than 30 years and has been presented with some of magic's highest awards and accolades.

Biography
Born in Wellington in 1950, Watson learned the art of magic from his great-great uncle, Oswald Ashton, at the age of seven.

He has appeared at the Magic Castle in Hollywood five times for a total of over 100 performances.  He was the founder and administrator of the MagicNZ BBS in 1993. Watson also founded the Magic New Zealand e-zine and has acted as editor from 1999 to present. In 1995 he was awarded the MIMC with Gold Star, the highest degree member of The Magic Circle. Watson and his wife Michele were presented the DRAGON Award in New York 2002. In 2006 he was a recipient of the Benny Award from the Variety Artists Club of New Zealand Inc, their highest honour.

Watson served as President for the New Zealand Society of Magicians from 1981 to 1983 and then from 1986 to 1989.  He is a life member of the International Brotherhood of Magicians, the Variety Artists Club of New Zealand and The Society of American Magicians.  In 2019 he was named Patron of the International Brotherhood of Magicians Ring 160.

Watson performs in the areas of corporate and family magic shows. In most of his acts, his wife Michele plays his assistant.

He was presented with the 2014 Award of Merit from the Academy of Magical Arts.

He was awarded the Queen's Service Medal, for services as a magician, in the 2015 New Year Honours.

He served as President of the Brotherhood of Auckland Magicians 2012-2021.

Awards and honours

 2018 - Patron, International Brotherhood of Magicians Ring 160
 2017 - Life Member, Brotherhood of Auckland Magicians Incorporated
 2016 - Order of Merlin - Shield - from IBM International President - for a long-standing membership (35 years) 
 2015 - Queen's Service Medal (QSM) for services as a magician
 2014 - Award of Merit - Academy of Magical Arts
 2014 - Hall of Fame - The Academy of Magical Arts - Hollywood, USA 
 2006 – New Zealand Grand Master of Magic Award
 2006 – Order of Merlin – International Brotherhood of Magicians
 2006 – Benny Award – Variety Artists Club of New Zealand Inc
 2005 – Presidential Citation from IBM International President
 2005 – Best Mental Effect – Linking Ring Awards
 2003 – Agnew Excellence Award – Variety Artists Club of New Zealand Inc
 2002 – DRAGON Award – J. Marberger Stuart Foundation (2002)
 1999 – Scroll of Honour – Variety Artists Club of New Zealand Inc
 1997 – Shure Golden Microphone – Most Professional Entertainer – Variety Artists Club of New Zealand Inc
 1995 – Member of the Inner Magic Circle (MIMC) with Gold Star – Magic Circle England
 1990 – 1st Place Close-up – 22nd Australian Convention of Magicians
 1982 – The Peter J. Shield Award – 18th Australian Convention of Magicians (for Outstanding Contribution to the Art of Mentalism)
 Six times Top Children's Entertainer – New Zealand International Magic Conventions
 Four times Top Close-up Magician – New Zealand International Magic Conventions
 Four times Top Magician – Variety Artists Club of New Zealand Inc

Magic publications

Alan has been featured in the following magic publications :
 The Magic Circular - August 2015 - Front cover - Pages 234-237
 Vanish Magazine – April 2013 Front Cover – Pages 30–45
 The Linking Ring – November 2006 – Front cover – Pages 35–40 plus 68–70
 The Linking Ring – July 2004 – Kiwi Magic, pages 83–107
 Magicana – August/September 2002 – Front cover, pages 8–11
 The Linking Ring – November 1998 – Front cover – Kiwi Magic, pages 87–105
 M.U.M. magazine  – September 1997 – Watson family front cover – Kiwi Magic, pages 15–25
 The Magic Circular [UK] – December 1995 – Front cover – New Zealand special section, pages 223–230.  Also in this edition Peter Blanchard wrote a double page spread on the Watson family "This Is Your Life", pages 234–235
 Genii Magazine [US] – October 1992 – Front cover – New Zealand special issue for which Alan compiled, pages 805–819
 Magicana – October/November 1989 – Front cover
 Magicana – July/August 1984 – Front Cover, pages 5–7

DVDs

 2007 – Alan Watson's 7 Secrets to Success (2 DVD SET)

Television appearances

 2016 - The Guy Cater Show on Face TV, Sky 083
 2014 - One Network News, TV3 News - upon being presented with the Queen's Service Medal
 2007 – Studio 2 LIVE (NZ children's show) – with granddaughter Aleshia
 2006 – Pacific Beat Street – with granddaughter Aleshia
 2006 – What Now? – with granddaughter Aleshia
 1996 – Good Morning
 1996 – The Great Kiwi Magic Show

Magic New Zealand E-zine

Watson publishes a weekly E-zine, Magic New Zealand. Magic New Zealand has more than 17,000 subscribers worldwide including many well-known magicians. It contains articles and writeups as well as performance dates and regular columnists.

References

External links
 Alan Watson Homepage
 Magic New Zealand E-zine
 
 
 
 
 
 Alan Watson's Grand Master of Magic Citation
 
 The Variety Artists Club of New Zealand Inc
 Brotherhood of Auckland Magicians Club

New Zealand magicians
People from Auckland
Living people
1950 births
Recipients of the Queen's Service Medal
People from Wellington City